Huegroncocha (possibly from in the Quechua spelling Wiqrunqucha; wiqru twisted, bent, -n a suffix, qucha lake,) is a lake in the Cordillera Blanca in the Andes of  Peru located in the Ancash Region, Asunción Province, Chacas District. Huegroncocha lies north of the lake Yanacocha and west of the lake Runtococha.

References 

Lakes of Peru
Lakes of Ancash Region